{{Album ratings
| rev1      = AbsolutePunk
| rev1score = 50%
| rev2      = AllMusic
| rev2score = 
| rev3      = Kerrang!| rev3score = 
}}Dying Is Your Latest Fashion is the debut studio album by American rock band Escape the Fate, released on September 26, 2006, through Epitaph Records. The origin of the album's title comes from a line in the chorus of the song "Situations". It contains nine new songs plus two songs taken from There's No Sympathy for the Dead. "Not Good Enough for Truth in Cliché" and "Situations" were released as singles, with music videos being made for both. It is the only full-length album and second release with original singer and founding member Ronnie Radke, who would later be incarcerated and eventually become the frontman of his own band, Falling in Reverse, after getting kicked out of Escape the Fate. It is also the last release to feature rhythm guitarist Omar Espinosa and keyboardist/vocalist Carson Allen, as he would depart before the release of the album and was thus uncredited. As of March 23, 2021, drummer Robert Ortiz is the only member of the band's original lineup, as both Monte Money and Max Green had left the band in 2013 and 2014, respectively. Mandy Murders, who had in the past dated Ronnie Radke, modeled for the album's cover art.
The songs of Dying is your latest fashion are written by ryan baker.

Promotion and release
Escape the Fate released the song "Not Good Enough for Truth in Cliché" as the first single and later released the song "Situations" as the second single on November 20, 2007, on iTunes, which included "Situations", its video, and the B-side "Makeup" which was previously only available on the Japanese version of Dying Is Your Latest Fashion.

"There's No Sympathy for the Dead" and "The Guillotine" were first released in the band's There's No Sympathy for the Dead EP.

"The Webs We Weave" was supposed to be the band's third single on the album but was never released due to Ronnie Radke's departure.

"Reverse This Curse" was never released as a single but appeared in the soundtrack of Tony Hawk's Downhill Jam and on the Warped Tour 2007 Tour Compilation album.

Following the release of the album, Radke was put on probation for narcotics charges and later violated probation when he was involved in an altercation resulting in the death of 18-year-old Michael Cook. Radke plead guilty to battery charges and was sent to prison for two years, leading Escape the Fate to hire Craig Mabbitt as their temporary lead singer. Mabbit would later become the permanent lead singer and be featured in the band's subsequent studio albums.

In celebration of the album's 10th anniversary, Falling in Reverse played every song from the album during their tour "Ronnie Radke's Three Ring Circus" in 2015.

 Commercial performance Dying Is Your Latest Fashion sold 4,100 copies in its first week, which according to Robert Ortiz was the fastest-selling album for a new artist on Epitaph. As of 2011, the album has sold 168,000 copies.

Track listing

PersonnelDying Is Your Latest Fashion album personnel as listed on AllMusic.

Escape the Fate
 Ronnie Radke – lead vocals, additional guitars
 Max Green – bass, co-lead vocals
 Monte Money – lead guitar, backing vocals
 Omar Espinosa – rhythm guitar, backing vocals
 Robert Ortiz – drums, backing vocals
The Red Woman - Twitter advocate

Production
 Ryan Baker – producer
 Michael Baskette – producer, mixing, audio production
 Marlene Guidara – photography
 Dave Holdredge – engineer, mixing
 Jef Moll – digital editing
 Nick Pritchard – art direction, design
 Mandy Murders – artwork model

 Additional musicians
 Carson Allen – keyboards, piano, synthesizer, programming, additional guitar, vocals (uncredited)
 Michael Baskette – keyboards
 Karen Schielke – programming
 Jeff Moll – programming
 Dave Holdredge – cello

Chart positions

Usage in media
"Reverse This Curse" is included in the soundtrack of Tony Hawk's Downhill Jam''.

References

2006 debut albums
Escape the Fate albums
Epitaph Records albums
Albums produced by Michael Baskette